Inside may refer to:

Film
 Inside (1996 film), an American television film directed by Arthur Penn and starring Eric Stoltz
 Inside (2002 film), a Canadian prison drama film
 Inside (2006 film), an American thriller film starring Nicholas D'Agosto and Leighton Meester
 Inside (2007 film), originally À l'intérieur, a French horror film directed by Alexandre Bustillo and Julien Maury
 Inside (2016 film), a 2016 Spanish-American film remake of the 2007 film
 Inside (2011 film), an American social film
 Inside (2012 film),  an American horror film
 Inside (2013 film), a Turkish drama film
 Bo Burnham: Inside, a 2021 American comedy special
 Inside (2023 film), an upcoming film starring Willem Dafoe

Television
 "Inside" (American Horror Story), an episode of the tenth season of American Horror Story

Music

Albums
 Inside (Bondy Chiu album), 1999
 Inside (BtoB 4U EP), 2020
 Inside (Eloy album), 1973
 Inside (Paul Horn album), 1968
 Inside (Ronnie Milsap album), 1982
 Inside (Bill Morrissey album), 1992
 Inside (Mother Mother album), 2021
 Inside (Orphanage album), 2000
 Inside (Parmalee album), 2004
 Inside (Presence album), 1993
 Inside (David Reilly EP), 2004
 Inside (David Sanborn album), 1999
 Inside (Matthew Sweet album), 1986
 Inside (White Heart album), 1995

Songs
 "Inside", by Jethro Tull from Benefit, 1970
 "Inside" (Ronnie Milsap song), 1982
 "Inside", by Moby from Play, 1999
 "Inside" (Monica song), 1999
 "Inside", by Peter, Paul and Mary from Peter, Paul & Mommy, Too, 1993
 "Inside" (Sevendust song), 2008
 "Inside" (Stiltskin song), 1994
 "Inside", by Sting from Sacred Love, 2003
 "Inside", by Toad The Wet Sprocket from Dulcinea (album), 1994
 "Inside", by Van Halen from 5150, 1986

Others
 Inside (video game), a 2016 video game by Playdead
 Inside Recordings, a record label

See also
 In (disambiguation)
 Inside Out (disambiguation)
 Insider (disambiguation)
 Insides (disambiguation)
 The Inside (disambiguation)
 Interior (disambiguation)